Lhota is a popular name of Czech villages, founded during the middle-age colonization in Bohemia, Moravia and Slovakia. It is assumed that most of them were founded in the 13th century and the first half of the 14th century. The name was first mentioned in 1199.

The inhabitants of newly founded villages had obligations towards suzerains, but those duties were usually suspended for a certain period (such as 5–8 years) as a compensation for felling of forests and making the land available for agriculture. This period used to be called "lhóta" (= 'grace period') and often became a part of the village name.

There are about 500 villages called Lhota or a derivation of this name (Lhotka, Lhotice, Lhoty, Lhůty in the Czech Republic; Lehota or Lehótka in Slovakia). The largest of them is Ostrožská Lhota in the Uherské Hradiště District. Most of them are in East, South-East and South Bohemia, outside the oldest inhabited area. Therefore, it is assumed that they were founded in the latter part of colonization process, on less fertile land on higher altitudes.

They were usually established by local inhabitants, namely smaller noblemen close to their own village. The name of the founder, usually of a Slavonic origin, became sometimes a part of village name (e.g., Vlachova Lhota).

In other cases, the adjective in village name relates to its size (Dlouhá Lhota – Long L.) or other characteristics (Dolní Lhota – Lower L., Písková Lhota – Sandy L.).

External links
The links below point to a map server of the Czech Republic. 
342 villages

Sources
Lhota – Czech Wikipedia (translation)
"Ask the Library" - information service of Czech National Library (quoting Pomístní jména v Čechách : o čem vypovídají jména polí, luk, lesů, hor, vod a cest by Libuše Olivová-Nezbedová, published in Prague 1995)

See also
Wola (settlement), a similar concept in Polish history
Sloboda, a similar concept in Russian history

Villages in the Czech Republic